An invocation (from the Latin verb invocare "to call on, invoke, to give") may take the form of:

Supplication, prayer or spell.
A form of possession.
Command or conjuration.
Self-identification with certain spirits.

These forms are described below, but are not mutually exclusive. 
See also Theurgy.

Supplication or prayer 
As a supplication or prayer, an invocation implies calling upon God, a god, goddess, or person. When a person calls upon God, a god, or goddess to ask for something (protection, a favour, or his/her spiritual presence in a ceremony) or simply for worship, this can be done in a pre-established form or with the invoker's own words or actions. An example of a pre-established text for an invocation is the Lord's Prayer.

All religions in general use invoking prayers, liturgies, or hymns; see for example the mantras in Hinduism and Buddhism, the Egyptian Coming Out by Day (aka Book of the Dead), the Orphic Hymns and the many texts, still preserved, written in cuneiform characters on clay tablets, addressed to Shamash, Ishtar, and other deities.

In Islam, invocation is a prayer of supplication or request. Muslims regard this as a profound act of worship. Muhammad is reported to have said, "Dua is the very essence of worship." One of the earliest treaties on invocations, attributed to a scholar named Khālid ibn Yazīd, has survived on a papyrus booklet dated 880-881.

As alternative to prayer 
An invocation can also be a secular alternative to a prayer. On August 30, 2012, Dan Nerren, a member of the Humanist Association of Tulsa, delivered a secular invocation to open a meeting of the City Council of Tulsa. Nerren was invited to perform the invocation as a compromise following a long-running dispute with the City Council over prayers opening meetings. The invocation was written by Andrew Lovley, a member of the Southern Maine Association of Secular Humanists who had previously used the invocation in 2009 to invoke an inauguration ceremony for new city officials in South Portland, Maine.

In this usage, it is comparable to an affirmation as an alternative for those who conscientiously object to taking oaths of any kind, be it for reasons of belief or non-belief.

A form of possession 
The word "possession" is used here in its neutral form to mean "a state (sometimes psychological) in which an individual's normal personality is replaced by another". This is also sometimes known as 'aspecting'.  This can be done as a means of communicating with or getting closer to a deity or spirit, and as such need not be viewed synonymously with demonic possession.

In some religious traditions including Paganism, Shamanism and Wicca, "invocation" means to draw a spirit or Spirit force into one's own body and is differentiated from "evocation", which involves asking a spirit or force to become present at a given location. Again, Aleister Crowley states that

Possessive invocation may be attempted singly or, as is often the case in Wicca, in pairs - with one person doing the invocation (reciting the liturgy or prayers and acting as anchor), and the other person being invoked (allowing themselves to become a vessel for the spirit or deity). The person successfully invoked may be moved to speak or act in non-characteristic ways, acting as the deity or spirit; and they may lose all or some self-awareness while doing so. A communication might also be given via imagery (a religious vision). They may also be led to recite a text in the manner of that deity, in which case the invocation is more akin to ritual drama. The Wiccan Charge of the Goddess is an example of such a pre-established recitation. See also the ritual of Drawing Down the Moon.

The ecstatic, possessory form of invocation may be compared to loa possession in the Vodou tradition where devotees are described as being "ridden" or "mounted" by the deity or spirit. In 1995 National Geographic journalist Carol Beckwith described events she had witnessed during Vodoun possessions:

Possessive invocation has also been described in certain Norse rites where Odin is invoked to "ride" workers of seidr (Norse shamanism), much like the god rides his eight-legged horse Sleipnir.  Indeed, forms of possessive invocation appear throughout the world in most mystical or ecstatic traditions, wherever devotees seek to touch upon the essence of a deity or spirit.

Command or conjuration 

Some have performed invocation for the purpose of controlling or extracting favors from certain spirits or deities.  These invocations usually involve a commandment or threat against the entity invoked.

The following is a curious example of such an invocation, found engraved in cuneiform on a statue of the Assyrian demon Pazuzu.  Although it seems to constitute an identification with the demon, it was actually considered a protective amulet with the power to command this entity not to harm people or their possessions.

Another example is found in the book Aradia, or the Gospel of the Witches during the Conjuration of Diana, where the goddess is evoked into a piece of bread and threatened to grant a wish:

Self-identification with certain spirits 
Invocation can refer to taking on the qualities of the being invoked, such as the allure of Aphrodite or the ferocity of Kali. In this instance the being is literally called up from within oneself (as an archetype) or into oneself (as an external force), depending on the personal belief system of the invoker. The main difference between this type of invocation and the possessive category described above is that the former may appear more controlled, with self-identification and deity-identification mixed together. In practice, invocations may blend many or all of these categories.  See for example this Hymn to Astarte from the Songs of Bilitis, first attributed to a contemporary of Sappho (but actually written by Pierre Louÿs in the 1890s):

References

Anthropology of religion
Ceremonial magic
Prayer
Ritual